B. darwinii may refer to:

Baccharis darwinii
Berberis darwinii, Darwin's Barberry, or Michay
Botryocladia darwinii

See also
 B. darwini (disambiguation)
 Darwinii (disambiguation)